Nartus sinuatus Black with dark rufous legs; posterior margin of pronotum arched just before hind angles(3) is a species of predaceous diving beetle in the family Dytiscidae, found in North America. This species was formerly a member of the genus Rhantus.

References

Dytiscidae
Articles created by Qbugbot
Beetles described in 1862